The 1906 Army Cadets football team represented the United States Military Academy in the 1906 college football season. The Cadets compiled a  record, shut out four opponents (including a scoreless tie with Colgate), and outscored all opponents by a combined total of 59 to 37.  Henry Smither was the coach in the first game of the season, and Ernest Graves, Sr. was the coach in games two through nine. The team's setbacks included losses to Harvard, Yale, and Princeton. In the annual Army–Navy Game, the Cadets lost to the Midshipmen  
 
Two Army players were honored by either Walter Camp (WC) or Caspar Whitney (CW) on the All-America team. They are tackle Henry Weeks (WC-3, CW-2) and guard William Christy (WC-3).

Schedule

References

Army
Army Black Knights football seasons
Army Cadets football